Bottreaux Castle (pronounced "Botro"), colloquially known as The Courte during the time John Leyland visited, is a ruined motte and bailey castle in Boscastle, England. It was originally built in the 12th century and only earthworks remain today.

History

Bottreaux Castle was likely built sometime between 1154 and 1189 (during the reign of Henry II) by Sir William des Bottreaux, and it was anciently in the possession of the de Botreaux family, which became under William de Botreaux (1337–91) the Barons Botreaux; the castle does not actually appear in records until the 13th century. The last member of the Bottreaux family died in 1462, and the castle soon fell into decay. In 1478, William Worcester mentioned Bottreaux Castle only as a manor house, John Leyland visited the castle in 1538, but the castle was likely demolished before he visited; he commented on the ruins, calling them "far unworthie the name of a castel; the people there, call it the Courte."  In , Richard Carew noted that it was once used as a unisex prison. He wrote:

"The first place which heere offreth itselfe to sight, is Bottreaux Castle, seated on a bad harbour of the North sea, & suburbed with a poore market town, yet entitling the owner in times past, with the stile of a Baron, from whom, by match it descended to the L. Hungerford, & [121] resteth in the Earle of Huntingdon. The diuersified roomes of a prison, in the Castle, for both sexes, better preserued by the Inhabitants memorie, then descerneable by their owne endurance, shew the same, heeretofore to haue exercised some large iurisdiction."

The castle was in ruins by 1769 and an 1852 survey by Maclaughlan found that although some walls were visible, only about half of the motte was visible. The current site of the castle sits on a steep spur overlooking the River Jordan in a public park and a war memorial is present on the site of the castle. It was designated as a Scheduled Monument on April 22, 1974.

References

Castles in Cornwall
Buildings and structures completed in the 12th century